Baron Heytesbury, of Heytesbury in the County of Wiltshire, is a title in the Peerage of the United Kingdom. It was created in 1828 for the prominent politician and diplomat Sir William à Court, 2nd Baronet, who later served as Ambassador to Russia and as Viceroy of Ireland. His son, the second Baron, sat as Member of Parliament for the Isle of Wight. On his marriage in 1837 to Elizabeth Holmes, daughter of Sir Leonard Worsley Holmes, Lord Heytesbury assumed the additional surname of Holmes. His son the 4th baron commanded a battalion in the Wiltshire Regiment (Duke of Edinburgh's) and was for a time in command of 62nd (Wiltshire) Regiment of Foot. , the titles are held by his great-great-great-grandson, the seventh Baron, who succeeded his father in 2004.

The baronetcy, of Heytesbury House in the County of Wiltshire, was created in the Baronetage of Great Britain on 4 July 1795 for the first Baron's father, William à Court. He was a colonel in the army and represented Heytesbury in the House of Commons. His father, William Ashe-à Court, was a general in the army and also sat as a Member of Parliament for Heytesbury.

A junior line of the family has attained fortune and fame in Australia, thanks to the business empire of Robert Holmes à Court, who was of South African birth, and his Western Australian wife Janet, now one of Australia's richest women. Their vast business interests are managed through Heytesbury Pty Ltd, a company named after the family peerage.

à Court baronets of Heytesbury (1795)
Sir William Pierce Ashe à Court, 1st Baronet (c. 1747–1817)
Sir William à Court, 2nd Baronet (1779–1860) (created Baron Heytesbury in 1828)

Baron Heytesbury (1828)
William à Court, 1st Baron Heytesbury (1779–1860)
William Henry Ashe à Court-Holmes, 2nd Baron Heytesbury (1809–1891)
William Frederick Holmes à Court, 3rd Baron Heytesbury (1862–1903)
Leonard Holmes à Court, 4th Baron Heytesbury (1863–1949)
William Leonard Frank Holmes à Court, 5th Baron Heytesbury (1906–1971)
Francis William Holmes à Court, 6th Baron Heytesbury (1931–2004)
James William Holmes à Court, 7th Baron Heytesbury (born 1967)

See also 
 Walter Hungerford, 1st Baron Hungerford of Heytesbury
 Baron Holmes

References

Books cited

Baronies in the Peerage of the United Kingdom
1795 establishments in Great Britain
1828 establishments in the United Kingdom
Extinct baronies in the Peerage of the United Kingdom
Noble titles created in 1828
Noble titles created for UK MPs